Nicholas Prasad (born 7 December 1995) is a professional footballer who plays as a defender for Bischofswerdaer FV 08 in the Regionalliga. Born in Canada, he represents the Fiji national football team.

Personal life
Prasad was born in Edmonton, Alberta to immigrant parents from the Fiji Islands, Arun and Rosene respectively, and has an older brother, Brendan, who works as a RCMP Police Officer.

Career

BC Soccer Provincial Development Program
Prasad played for the BC Soccer Provincial Development Program from 2008-2011. He captained the team to a bronze medal against Alberta at the National Tournament. His performances led to an invitation to the Canadian Youth National Training Team.

Enver Creek Secondary
Prasad attended Enver Creek Secondary, where he captained the Cougars to their first BC High School Provincial Championship in 2012. Prasad also won the Enver Creek Student-Athlete of the Year award from 2008-2011.

Vancouver Whitecaps FC
In 2012, Prasad joined the Vancouver Whitecaps FC Academy. He helped the team win the USSDA Northwest Division title during the regular season, which led to a birth in the USSDA Finals in Houston. The following year, Prasad captained the team to a second place finish in the USSDA Northwest Division.
 In 2014, Prasad appeared for USL PDL side Vancouver Whitecaps FC U-23. He scored his first goal for the U-23 side against Portland Timbers U-23's in a 2-2 draw at Providence Park. Prasad's impressive performances led him to make his senior team debut, coming on for Ethen Sampson in the 45th minute against FC Edmonton in a reserve fixture.

Seattle Redhawks
In 2014, Prasad signed a letter of intent to play NCAA Division I college soccer at Seattle University.
In his sophomore season, the 11th-ranked Redhawks defeated the UCLA Bruins, 1-0, at Championship Field to advance to the sweet sixteen of the Division 1 NCAA tournament for the first time in the program's history.
Prasad recorded an assist in the game and was named to the TopDrawerSoccer Team of the week. Prasad appeared in 61 games for the Redhawks.

SpVgg Bayreuth
In 2018, Prasad signed a professional contract with Regionalliga side SpVgg Bayreuth in Germany. Prasad made his home debut at Hans-Walter-Wild-Stadion in a 2-0 loss against SpVgg Greuther Fürth II. Prasad recorded his first assist for the club in a derby match against Bayern Hof in the Landespokal Bayern.

Tulsa Roughnecks FC
On July 16, 2019, Prasad was acquired by the USL Championship side Tulsa Roughnecks, for an undisclosed fee. He made his USL Championship debut in a 1-0 win away at H-E-B Park against Rio Grande Valley FC Toros.

Bischofswerdaer FV 08
In January 2020, Prasad signed for Regionalliga Nordost side Bischofswerdaer FV 08. He made his debut against FSV Union Fürstenwalde in a 2-0 loss.

International career
In 2019, Prasad was called into the Fiji national football team for official FIFA International friendlies against New Caledonia and Mauritius. On March 18, 2019, he made his debut against New Caledonia and recorded an assist in the 3-0 victory. Prasad has been a regular in Christophe Gamel's side since his debut. In 2019, Prasad was selected for the 2019 Pacific Games in Samoa. Prasad anchored the backline of the Fijians and helped the team win a bronze medal.

References

External links

 Scores24.live

Living people
1995 births
Soccer players from Edmonton
Fiji international footballers
Fijian footballers
Canadian soccer players
Canadian people of Fijian descent
Canadian people of Indo-Fijian descent
Fijian people of Indian descent
Association football defenders
Fijian expatriate footballers
Canadian expatriate soccer players
Fijian expatriates in Germany
Canadian expatriates in Germany
Fijian expatriates in the United States
Canadian expatriates in the United States
Expatriate footballers in Germany
USL League Two players
Vancouver Whitecaps FC U-23 players
Seattle Redhawks men's soccer players
SpVgg Bayreuth players
FC Tulsa players
USL Championship players